The Regius Professor of Anatomy is a Regius Professorship at the University of Aberdeen in Scotland.
Seven people have been appointed to this position:

References

Anatomy
Anatomy
Professorships in medicine
Anatomists